Missing Link is the name of four fictional characters appearing in American comic books published by Marvel Comics.

Publication history
The second Missing Link first appeared in The Incredible Hulk vol. 2 #105-106 (July–Aug. 1968), and was created by Bill Everett, Roy Thomas, and Marie Severin. This story was later reprinted in Marvel Treasury Edition #5 (1974). The character subsequently appears in The Incredible Hulk vol. 2 #179 (Sept. 1974), and Rom #29 (April 1982). The Missing Link received an entry in the Marvel Legacy: The 1970s Handbook #1 (2006).

Fictional character biography

Time-traveling Missing Link
The Missing Link came from a post-apocalyptic Earth which was ravaged by an atomic war. He travels back in time to get an insight into Earth's past and arrives on an uncharted island in the Pacific Ocean. Three unnamed scientists exploring the island at the time discover him where they thought was a prehistoric ancestor of mankind. They bring him back with them to civilization. It takes them months to communicate with him. He does not talk to avoid meddling with the past. The Missing Link finally breaks down and begs for the scientists to take him back to the island. Once they are back on the island, the Missing Link reveals that he came from the future where a great atomic war had changed all of humanity. Before disappearing into his time machine, he begs the scientists to find a way to end all warfare.

Circus of Crime's Missing Link
Missing Link is a member of Fritz Tibolt's incarnation of the Circus of Crime who had a primate-like face. During the group's fight with Captain America and Bucky, Missing Link was knocked out by Bucky.

Radioactive Missing Link

The Missing Link is a superhumanly strong Neanderthal-like humanoid whose body absorbs and emits radiation. Eventually the Missing Link builds up so much radiation that he explodes, but he can then reconstruct his body.

The creature known as the "Missing Link" in modern times was born countless millennia ago. He was sealed in an underground pocket during a volcanic eruption, leaving him in suspended animation until modern times.

A Chinese atomic test causes a rift to open in the ground, spewing magma to the surface, and a few days later the creature crawls out, mutating into a radioactive monster. The Chinese capture him with sleeping-gas, but once fully mutated the Missing Link becomes too powerful to control. To be rid of him, the Chinese place him in a lead-lined capsule aboard a freighter from a satellite nation, to be launched into New York harbor. During his ensuing rampage through New York, he repeatedly fights the Hulk, and it emerges that prolonged exposure to the radiation from the Missing Link triggers the Hulk's transformations to and from human form. During the last of their battles, both are captured by Russian Colonel Yuri Brevlov, who flies them behind the Iron Curtain. While aboard the Russian ship, the Missing Link explodes into thousands of pieces from radiation buildup.

Eventually, its body reconstructs itself in the Appalachian Mountains of West Virginia. The Brickfords, a local family, find him and care for him. The Brickfords name him "Lincoln", educate him, and get him a job in the mines. The Brickfords also take in Bruce Banner soon after. Bruce recognizes who Lincoln is after Jimmy-Jack Brickford falls sick from radiation poisoning due to exposure to Lincoln. Bruce confronts Lincoln to get him to leave the Brickfords, but Lincoln does not believe him and attacks. As the Missing Link fights the Hulk, his touch burns the Hulk and he realizes that Banner was telling the truth just as he reaches critical mass and explodes again. When the Hulk and the Missing Link crawl from the wreckage, the Brickfords and the other citizens think that the Hulk was responsible for the destruction and the child's sickness as Lincoln was only protecting them. The Hulk leaves the area unnoticed when Lincoln is no longer a threat.

When Lincoln reforms into a solid form again, he continues to live with the Brickfords and work in the mines. The mines begin to leak toxic fumes, making people leave or become sick. Lincoln realizes this is his fault, and he hides deep in the mines. The Spaceknight Rom detects the radiation and investigates, curing the Brickfords of their radiation poisoning. Rom finds Lincoln and explains to him that he is a threat to the entire planet. Rom uses his neutralizer to purge Lincoln of his radiation.

However, the town cannot be rebuilt and the Brickfords are forced to turn Lincoln over to the authorities, after which they move out west.

Ray Morgan
Ray Morgan was a member of the Chain Gang who fought the Sleepwalker. He is always insecure and has a difficult time making a decision.

Powers and abilities
The radioactive Missing Link is superhumanly strong, with sufficient might to rival the Hulk. His body is crystalline. When struck with sufficient force, it can shatter, but will quickly fuse back together. His body generates radiation. He can melt concrete or even burn the Hulk's skin. This radiation eventually builds to a critical level, causing the Missing Link to explode. When he reforms afterwards, his radiation level is temporarily reduced.

The Ray Morgan version of the Missing Link had the ability to teleport himself and others.

References

External links
 
 

Characters created by Bill Everett
Characters created by Roy Thomas
Comics characters introduced in 1968
Fictional characters with nuclear or radiation abilities
Marvel Comics characters with superhuman strength
Marvel Comics supervillains